Mikołaj Biegański (born 5 April 2002) is a Polish professional footballer who plays as a goalkeeper for Wisła Kraków.

References

External links
 
 

Living people
2002 births
Sportspeople from Częstochowa
Association football goalkeepers
Polish footballers
Poland youth international footballers
Raków Częstochowa players
Skra Częstochowa players
Wisła Kraków players
Ekstraklasa players
I liga players
II liga players
III liga players